The 2009–10 Tulane Green Wave women's basketball team will represent Tulane University in the 2009–10 NCAA Division I women's basketball season. The Green Wave will be coached by Lisa Stockton. The Green Wave are a member of Conference USA and will attempt to win its first NCAA championship.

Offseason
July 10: Tulane women's basketball announced the addition of Shondra Johnson to the coaching staff. The New Orleans native and all-SEC performer at Alabama was a member of the coaching staff at Samford University.
August 14: Head coach Lisa Stockton announced an addition to the team. Janique Kautsky will join the program. The 5-10 guard/forward comes to Tulane from Perth, Australia.

Preseason

Regular season
The Green Wave will participate in the Navy Classic from November 20–21. In addition, the club will participate in the Big Easy Classic on December 4 and 5. From December 28–29, the club will host the Tulane DoubleTree Classic.

Roster

Schedule

* Conference USA Game

Player stats

Postseason

Conference USA Tournament

NCAA basketball tournament

Awards and honors
 Chassity Brown, All C-USA Second Team
 Danielle Nunn, All C-USA Third Team
 Olivia Grayson, All C-USA Freshman Team
 Lisa Stockton, C-USA Coach of the Year

Team players drafted into the WNBA

See also
Tulane Green Wave

References

Tulane
Tulane Green Wave women's basketball seasons
Tulane
Tulane
Tulane